Magny-Cours is a commune in the Nièvre department in central France.

It is the home of the Circuit de Nevers Magny-Cours, a famous motor racing circuit (whose name is often abbreviated to 'Magny-Cours'). It formerly hosted the Formula One French Grand Prix.

Magny-Cours also hosts the Conservatoire de la monoplace française.

See also
 Communes of the Nièvre department

References

External links

 Circuit de Nevers Magny-Cours

Communes of Nièvre